Service fraternity may refer to any fraternal public service organization, such as the Kiwanis or Rotary International. In Canada and the United States, the term fraternal organization is more common as "fraternity" in everyday usage refers to fraternal student societies.

In the context of the North American student fraternity and sorority system, service fraternities and service sororities comprise a type of organization whose primary purpose is community service. Members of these organizations are not restricted from joining other types of fraternities. This may be contrasted with professional fraternities, whose primary purpose is to promote the interests of a particular profession, and general or social fraternities, whose primary purposes are generally aimed towards some other aspect, such as the development of character, friendship, leadership, or literary ability.

Some general fraternities and their chapters, especially members of the National Pan-Hellenic Council, emphasize the service aspects of their activities; however classification as a strictly service organization has legal meaning in regard to Title IX. Service fraternities, like professional fraternities and honor societies must be open to members of both genders since they do not have an exemption from Title IX similar to the one given in section (A)(6)(a) for social fraternities and sororities.

Collegiate service fraternities and sororities

Notes

Non-collegiate service fraternities and sororities

Notes

See also

 Fraternity
 List of general fraternities
 List of social fraternities and sororities

References

Fraternities and sororities
Lists of student societies
Service organizations based in the United States